Federico Castillo Yanes (? – 13 April 2013) was a Salvadoran military officer who served as the Minister of National Defense of El Salvador from 1 July 1977 until his resignation on 15 October 1979.

Biography 

Federico Castillo Yanes was born in El Salvador and became officer in the Army.

He was appointed as Minister of National Defense by President Carlos Humberto Romero on 1 July 1977. He resigned and left for exile on 15 October 1979 following the overthrow of President Romero.

Castillo Yanes died in San Salvador, El Salvador, on 13 April 2013.

See also 

Minister of National Defense of El Salvador

References 

Year of birth unknown
2013 deaths
Defence ministers of El Salvador
Leaders ousted by a coup
Salvadoran military personnel